DYSB-TV is a commercial relay television station in the Philippines owned by Sumuroy Broadcasting Corporation and affiliated with ABS-CBN Corporation. Its studio is located at Del Pilar Street corner Garcia Ave., Catbalogan, Province of Samar.

ABS-CBN TV-7 Catbalogan Programs
TV Patrol Eastern Visayas

ABS-CBN TV-7 Catbalogan Defunct Programs 
TV Patrol Tacloban

See also
 List of ABS-CBN Corporation channels and stations
 DYAB-TV

Television stations in Samar (province)
Television channels and stations established in 1994
ABS-CBN stations
1994 establishments in the Philippines